Francis Cottington, 1st Baron Cottington (c. 15791652) was the English lord treasurer and ambassador and leader of the pro-Spanish, pro-Roman Catholic faction in the court of Charles I.

Early life
He was the fourth son of Philip Cottington of Godmanstone, then in Somerset. According to Hoare, his mother was Jane, daughter of Thomas Biflete, but according to Clarendon, "a Stafford nearly allied to Sir Edward Stafford", through whom he was recommended to Sir Charles Cornwallis, ambassador to the court of Philip III of Spain, becoming a member of his suite and acting as English agent on the latter's recall, from 1609 to 1611.

Career

In 1612 he was appointed English consul at Seville. Returning to England, he was made a clerk of the council in September 1613. His Spanish experience rendered him useful to King James, and his bias in favour of Spain was always marked. He seemed to have promoted the Spanish policy from the first, and pressed on Diego Sarmiento de Acuña, conde de Gondomar, the Spanish ambassador, the proposal for the Spanish in opposition to the French marriage for Prince Charles (later King Charles I).

In 1616 he went as ambassador to Spain, transferring in 1618 the proposal of mediation by James I in the dispute with Frederick V, Elector Palatine.

After his return he was appointed secretary to Prince Charles in October 1622, and was knighted and made a baronet in 1623. He strongly disapproved of the prince's expedition to Spain, as an adventure likely to upset the whole policy of marriage and alliance, but was overruled and chosen to accompany him. His opposition greatly incensed George Villiers, 1st Duke of Buckingham, and still more his perseverance in the Spanish policy after the failure of the expedition, and on Charles I's accession Cottington was through his means dismissed from all his employments and forbidden to appear at court. The duke's assassination, however, enabled him to return.

He was a Roman Catholic at least at heart, becoming a member of that communion in 1623, returning to Protestantism, and again declaring himself a Roman Catholic in 1636, and supporting the cause of the Roman Catholics in England. On 12 November 1628 he was made a privy councillor, and in March 1629 appointed chancellor of the exchequer. In the autumn he was again sent as ambassador to Spain; he signed the peace treaty of 5 November 1630 and subsequently a secret agreement arranging for the partition of the Dutch Republic between Spain and England in return for the restoration of the Palatinate. On 10 July 1631 he was created Baron Cottington of Hanworth in Middlesex.

In March 1635 he was appointed master of the Court of Wards and Liveries, and his exactions in this office added greatly to the unpopularity of the government. He was also appointed a commissioner for the Treasury, together with William Laud, and a fierce rivalry sprang up between the two men. However, in their personal encounters Cottington nearly always had the advantage, because he practised great reserve and possessed great powers of self-command, an extraordinary talent for dissembling, and a fund of humour. Laud completely lacked these qualities, and although really possessing much greater influence with Charles, he was often embarrassed and sometimes exposed to ridicule by his opponent.

The aim of Cottington's ambition was the place of lord treasurer, but Laud finally triumphed and secured it for his own nominee, Bishop Juxon, when Cottington became "no more a leader but meddled with his particular duties only." He continued, however, to take a large share in public business and served on the committees for foreign, Irish, and Scottish affairs. In the last, appointed in July 1638, he supported the war, and in May 1640, after the dismissal of the Short Parliament, he declared it his opinion that at such a crisis the king might levy money without the Parliament. His attempts to get funds from the City of London were unsuccessful, and he had recourse instead to a speculation in pepper.

He had been appointed constable of the Tower, and he now prepared the fortress for a siege. In the trial of Strafford in 1641, Cottington denied on oath that he had heard him use the incriminating words about "reducing this kingdom". When the parliamentary opposition became too strong to be any longer defied, Cottington, as one of those who had chiefly incurred their hostility, hastened to retire from the administration, giving up the court of wards in May 1641 and the chancellorship of the exchequer in January 1642. He rejoined the king in 1643, took part in the proceedings of the Oxford Parliament, and was made lord treasurer on 3 October 1643. He signed the surrender of Oxford in July 1646, and being excepted from the indemnity retired abroad.

Career decline and death

He joined Prince Charles at the Hague in 1648, and became one of his counsellors. In 1649, together with Edward Hyde, Cottington went on a mission to Spain to obtain help for the royal cause, having an interview with Cardinal Mazarin at Paris on the way. They met, however, with an extremely ill reception, and Cottington found he had completely lost his popularity at the Spanish court, one cause being his shortcomings and waverings in the matter of religion. He  announced his intention of remaining in Spain and of keeping faithful to Roman Catholicism, and took up his residence at Valladolid, where he was maintained by the Jesuits. He died there on 19 June 1652, his body being subsequently buried in Westminster Abbey.

He had amassed a large fortune and built two magnificent houses at Hanworth near Heathrow and Fonthill near Tisbury, Wiltshire. Cottington was evidently a man of considerable ability, but the foreign policy he pursued was opposed to the national interests and futile in itself. According to Clarendon's verdict "he left behind him a greater esteem of his parts than love of his person."

Personal life
He married in 1623 Anne, a daughter of Sir William Meredith and the widow of Sir Robert Brett. All his children predeceased him, and his title became extinct at his death.

Notes

References
  This cites:
, and authorities there quoted
Clarendon's State Papers and Life
Strafford's Letters
Gardiner's Hist. of England and of the Commonwealth
Hoare's Wiltshire
Laud's Works, vols. iii.-vii.
Winwood's Memorials: A Refutation of a False and Impious Aspersion cast on the late Lord Cottington
John Dart, Westmonasterium, i. 181 (epitaph and monument).

References

 
 

|-

|-

|-

|-

1570s births
1652 deaths
Barons in the Peerage of England
Chancellors of the Exchequer of England
Ambassadors of England to Spain
Lord-Lieutenants of Dorset
Members of the pre-1707 English Parliament for constituencies in Cornwall
English MPs 1624–1625
English MPs 1625
English MPs 1628–1629
People from Somerset
Clerks of the Privy Council
16th-century English nobility
Burials at Westminster Abbey
17th-century English diplomats
Lord High Admirals of England
Lords of the Admiralty